Dick Paradise (April 21, 1945) is a retired American ice hockey player who played 144 games in the World Hockey Association for the Minnesota Fighting Saints.

Career statistics

Awards and honors

References

External links
 

1945 births
Living people
American men's ice hockey defensemen
Buffalo Bisons (AHL) players
Ice hockey people from Saint Paul, Minnesota
Johnstown Jets players
Minnesota Fighting Saints players
Omaha Knights (CHL) players
Seattle Totems (WHL) players
Tidewater Wings players